NTDS can refer to:
 Naval Tactical Data System
 Neglected tropical diseases 
 Neural tube defects
 NT Directory Service